The Anglo-French Survey (1784–1790) was the geodetic survey to measure the relative position of Greenwich Observatory and the Paris Observatory via triangulation. The English operations, executed by William Roy, consisted of the measurements of bases at Hounslow Heath (1784) and Romney Marsh (1787), the measurements of the angles of the triangles (1787–1788) and finally the calculation of all the triangles (1788–1790).  The  survey is very significant as the first precise survey within Britain, and the forerunner of the work of the Ordnance Survey which was  founded in 1791, one year after Roy's death.

Cassini's memoir
Late in life, when he was 57, Roy was granted the opportunity to establish his lasting reputation in the world of geodesy. The opening came from a completely unexpected direction. In 1783 Cassini de Thury addressed a memoir to the Royal Society in which he expressed grave reservations of the measurements of latitude and longitude which had been undertaken at Greenwich Observatory. He suggested that the correct values might be found by combining the Paris Observatory figures with a precise trigonometric survey between the two observatories. (The French surveys had already been carried out in the course of the preparation of the map of France.) This criticism was roundly rejected by Nevil Maskelyne who was convinced of the accuracy of the Greenwich measurements but, at the same time, he realised that Cassini's memoir provided a means of promoting government funding for a survey which would be valuable in its own right. Approval was granted and Sir Joseph Banks, president of the Royal Society, proposed that Roy should lead the project. Roy gladly accepted and set matters in motion by submitting to the Crown a grossly-underestimated budget for manpower (by far the largest element) and new precision instruments to be constructed by Jesse Ramsden. The whole project is described in Roy's three large articles in the Philosophical Transactions of the Royal Society of London in 1785, 1787 and 1790.
There are shorter accounts of the project in the History of the Royal Engineers by Porter 
and in every history of the Ordnance Survey, particularly the book by Seymour 
and also that by Owen and Pilbeam.

The Hounslow Heath base, 1784

The first task of any survey is to establish a baseline and, after a search by Roy and three other members of the Royal Society on 16 April, they fixed upon the heart of what was mainly still common land, the western swathe of Hounslow Heath. This was a near-uniform descent from  AOD between King's Arbour (memorialised by a replica cannon outside of the Northern Perimeter Road of Heathrow airport) and a point in the fields of Hampton Poor-house, five miles and one thousand feet to the south-east.  The direction was first chosen to suit the lie of the land, but it was seen to almost coincide with the telescopic view toward the steeple of All Saints' church in Banstead, about 12 miles away, and it was therefore made to coincide exactly with that direction: it is shown as a blue line on the map, inset.

The ground was cleared of bushes and a preliminary measurement of the line was carried out with a 100 ft. steel chain of 100 links prepared by Jesse Ramsden. It was the intention to measure more accurately with a set of three calibrated deal rods manufactured as 20 ft. in length. Three were supported on trestles and the ends aligned to an accuracy of a thousandth part of an inch. The first rod was then carried to the end of the third, an operation to be repeated 1370 times. Unfortunately the deal rods had to be abandoned because of their susceptibility to lengthen and shorten in wet weather, and they were replaced by those one-inch-thick made of glass. The rods were not affected by humidity but it was key to correct for thermal expansion. There was also a correction to sea level since the calculation of the survey was referred to that height. The final measurement gives the length of the base as 27404.01 ft. The measurement of the baseline to such a high standard of precision was a remarkable achievement and in recognition the Royal Society awarded Roy the Copley Medal in 1785.

In 1784 the ends of the baseline were marked by the central axes of two vertical wooden pipes over which the theodolite was centred for measurements from the base: the pipes could also support flagstaffs as markers when the base was sighted from other stations (or one end from another). After the resurvey in 1791  the pipes were replaced by cannons which are still in place although it is certain that the cannons have been disturbed and slightly moved over the intervening years. The modern locations of the southeast end points is in Roy Grove, Hampton. The northwest end at Heathrow Airport  is situated on the northern perimeter road. Plaques adjacent to the cannons read as follows:
THIS TABLET WAS AFFIXED IN 1926 TO COMMEMORATE THE 200TH 
ANNIVERSARY OF THE BIRTH OF MAJOR GENERAL WILLIAM ROY F.R.S., 
BORN  4TH MAY 1726 – DIED 1ST JULY 1790.
HE CONCEIVED THE IDEA OF CARRYING OUT THE TRIANGULATION OF THIS COUNTRY AND OF CONSTRUCTING A COMPLETE AND ACCURATE MAP, AND THEREBY LAID THE FOUNDATION OF THE ORDNANCE SURVEY.
THIS GUN MARKS THE S.E. TERMINAL OF THE BASE WHICH WAS MEASURED IN 1784 UNDER THE SUPERVISION OF GENERAL ROY, AS PART OF THE OBSERVATIONS FOR DETERMINING THE RELATIVE POSITIONS OF THE GREENWICH AND PARIS OBSERVATORIES – THIS MEASUREMENT WAS RENDERED POSSIBLE BY THE MUNIFICENCE OF H.M. KING GEORGE III, WHO INSPECTED THE WORK ON 21ST AUGUST 1784.
THE BASE WAS MEASURED AGAIN IN 1791 BY CAPTAIN MUDGE, AS THE COMMENCEMENT OF THE PRINCIPAL TRIANGULATION OF GREAT BRITAIN.
LENGTH OF BASE – REDUCED TO M.S.L.
• AS MEASURED BY ROY – 27404.01 FEET
• AS MEASURED BY MUDGE – 27404.24 FEET
• DETERMINED BY CLARKE IN 1858 IN TERMS OF THE ORDNANCE SURVEY STANDARD 01 – 27406.19 FEET

Waiting for Ramsden
Once the baseline had been measured Roy was keen to press on with the triangulation as soon as possible but he was thwarted by Ramsden's failure to produce the new theodolite. This led to a certain amount of acrimony and Roy went so far as to accuse Ramsden of being remiss and dilatory—in public and in his next report in the Philosophical Transactions.

The 1787 report is witness to how Roy occupied himself whilst waiting for the theodolite. The first section deals with the proposed route of the survey. Greater accuracy is achieved if the triangles are kept regular in shape, and the figure shows that most are close to equilateral, with departures only where the triangles step down in size toward the bases and where they have to stretch over the Channel. Typical sides are about 20 miles but the lines which cross the Channel are up to 45 miles in length.

The second part of the report is a thorough examination of the results of Cassini's survey of France between Paris and Dunkirk. The third part includes a comparison of seven models for the Figure of the Earth, deduced from both meridian arcs and pendulum experiments, and he goes on to propose further meridian arcs in India and Russia, as well as an arc of longitude at the equator. Finally, he makes a plea for the continuation of the survey to the rest of Great Britain.

The triangulation, 1787

Ramsden's theodolite was eventually delivered in the summer of 1787, and all haste was made to complete as much as possible before winter. The first triangles were from the ends of the base to Hanger Hill Tower in Ealing and St Ann's Hill in Chertsey, with an additional  sight to Windsor Castle from the NW end only. Thus two angles were measured at the SE end of the base and four angles at the NW end. The theodolite was then moved to Hanger Hill where the ends of the base line were observed from the other direction and another three new sight lines established to Greenwich Observatory, Upper Norwood and Hundred Acres (Banstead).  In this way the mesh of triangles was extended down towards the coast where sights could be made on some of the French stations that had been measured in the course of Cassini's triangulation. The figure below shows the actual triangulation, the relief making the structure more understandable. Note the second base at Romney Marsh. By comparing the measured length with the length as calculated through the triangulation mesh it was possible to assess the accuracy of the framework.

The process seems deceptively simple but it demanded much in the way of perseverance and organisation. Once the theodolite was on a station, signal men were sent to all the other stations that were to be observed from that point, typically five or six stations but as many as 10 in the case of Fairlight Head. For short distances a simple flagstaff would suffice but for the longer sights it was necessary to use lights at night. The brightest lights, so called white lights, were obtained by burning an incendiary mixture that lasted for a short time only. The cross-channel use of these lights entailed careful timing arrangements which could take into account the vagaries of the weather and pocket watches. At many stations, for the theodolite or signals, it was necessary to raise the instrument on a portable tower over 30 ft. high. The tower had two components: an inner frame supported the instrument and the outer supported the observers, thus minimising the disturbance to the instrument.

The final report
The final report of 1790 presents figures for the distance between Paris and Greenwich as well as the precise latitude, longitude and height of the British triangulation stations. Throughout the survey Roy took every opportunity to fix the position of as many secondary landmarks as possible in the hope that they would be used as a basis for future topographic surveys from which new maps could be prepared for the counties of  Middlesex, Surrey, Kent and Sussex. In fact these counties were re-surveyed during the course of the Principal Triangulation of Great Britain which commenced in 1791, one year after he died. At the time of his death he was correcting the final proofs of his report and the work was brought to a conclusion by Isaac Dalby, a senior civilian employee of the Board of Ordnance who had organised the calculations of the triangles.

Notes

Bibliography

 Freely available online at the Ordnance Survew, Owen and Pilbeam
 Volume 1; Volume 2.
 Freely available online at the Ordnance Survey, Seymour

 Plates follow text

See also
Principal Triangulation of Great Britain
Ordnance Survey
Surveying
Triangulation

Ordnance Survey
Geodetic surveys